2012 Academy Awards may refer to:

 84th Academy Awards, the Academy Awards ceremony which took place in 2012
 85th Academy Awards, the Academy Awards ceremony which took place in 2013 honoring the best in film for 2012